Virendra Chaudhary is an Indian politician and a member of the Indian National Congress. He is a MLA from Uttar Pradesh.

Electoral Performances

References
 
 
 

Uttar Pradesh MLAs 2022–2027
Indian National Congress politicians from Uttar Pradesh
Year of birth missing (living people)
Living people
Place of birth missing (living people)